Jože Međimurec (born 6 August 1945) is a Slovenian and Yugoslav middle-distance runner. He competed in the men's 800 metres at the 1972 Summer Olympics.

References

1945 births
Living people
Athletes (track and field) at the 1972 Summer Olympics
Yugoslav male middle-distance runners
Slovenian male middle-distance runners
Olympic athletes of Yugoslavia
People from the Municipality of Lendava
Mediterranean Games silver medalists for Yugoslavia
Mediterranean Games medalists in athletics
Athletes (track and field) at the 1971 Mediterranean Games